Susana Cristina Carvalheira Barroso (born 10 June 1974) is a retired Portuguese Paralympic swimmer and boccia player who competes in international level events. She was the first Portuguese swimmers to win a medal in swimming at the Summer Paralympics and was the most medalled female Paralympian for her country.

Barroso had a fourteen-year swimming career starting in 1991 where she won a bronze medal in a European swimming championships for disabled swimmers and retired from swimming in 2005. She played boccia two years after her retirement and returned to the Paralympics eight years later at the 2012 Summer Paralympics when she competed in boccia where she did not medal in her event.

References

1974 births
Living people
Swimmers from Lisbon
Paralympic swimmers of Portugal
Swimmers at the 1992 Summer Paralympics
Swimmers at the 1996 Summer Paralympics
Swimmers at the 2000 Summer Paralympics
Swimmers at the 2004 Summer Paralympics
Boccia players at the 2012 Summer Paralympics
Medalists at the 1992 Summer Paralympics
Medalists at the 1996 Summer Paralympics
Medalists at the 2000 Summer Paralympics
Medalists at the 2004 Summer Paralympics
Medalists at the World Para Swimming Championships
Portuguese female freestyle swimmers
Paralympic boccia players of Portugal
Portuguese female backstroke swimmers
S3-classified Paralympic swimmers